Garig Gunak Barlu is a protected area in the Northern Territory of Australia on the Cobourg Peninsula and some adjoining waters about  north-east of the territory capital of Darwin. 

It was established by joining the former Gurig National Park and the Cobourg Marine Park. Its name derives from the local Garig language, and the words gunak 'land' and barlu 'deep water'.

The national park consists of all land of the Cobourg Peninsula, of Burford Island, the Sir George Hope Islands (from west to east Greenhill, Wangoindjung, Warldagawaji, Morse, Wunmiyi), Mogogout Island and Endyalgout Island (117.4 km2) to the south of the peninsula, and of adjacent waters. Croker Island, although close east of the peninsula, is not part of the park.

It is categorized  as an IUCN Category II protected area.

See also 
 Protected areas of the Northern Territory

References

External links 
 NASA Earth Observatory
 Garig Gunak National Park Website
 Official fact sheet and map

Arnhem Land tropical savanna
Cobourg Peninsula
National parks of the Northern Territory
Protected areas established in 2000
Ramsar sites in Australia
2000 establishments in Australia